Rhythm & Romance is the fifth studio album by The System. It was released in Japan and United States under Atlantic Records in 1989. It reached the position 85 on the Billboard R&B Albums chart.

The abum was influenced by the contemporary R&B sound of new jack swing and hip-hop styles.  It would be the group's last album for over a decade.

Track listing
All tracks composed by David Frank and Michael Murphy
"I'm About You" – 4:13
"Soul to Soul" – 5:22
"Wicked" – 4:25
"Midnight Special" – 3:53
"I Don't Know How To Say..." – 4:36
" I Wanna Be Your Lover" – 4:04
"You Got Me (Where You Want Me)" – 4:06
"Have Mercy" – 5:03
"Face The Music" – 4:48
"Think About It" – 4:51

Production
Bob Defrin – art direction
Herb Powers – mastering
 Roy Volkmann – photography
 Leroy Quintyn  – Assistant technician (tracks 01 to 06, 08 to 10)
Bob Rosa – mixing (tracks 01, 02)
Keith Cohen – mixing (tracks 03, 04, 06, 08, 10, 12)
Steve Peck - mixing (track 05)
Ray Bardani - mixing (track 11)
Stephen Seltzer - mixing (tracks 07, 09); recording (tracks 01, 03, 05 to 10, 12)
Rob Feaster - recording (tracks 02 to 04, 10, 11)

Personnel
David Frank - keyboards
Mic Murphy - lead and backing vocals
Paul Pesco - guitar ("Soul to Soul")
Mike Campbell - guitar ("Midnight Special" and "Think About It")
Chep Nuñez, Cindy Mizelle, B.J. Nelson, Yogi Lee – additional backing vocals
Errol "Crusher" Bennett, Bashiri Johnson – percussion
Cut Creator – scratching
Dupont, Leroy Quintyn, Robert Dukes, Mic Murphy - Science Lab Posse on "Face the Music"

Chart performance

References

1989 albums
The System (band) albums
Atlantic Records albums